Jo Haazen (born Antwerp, 24 December 1944) is a Flemish musician and carillonneur.

He studied organ and piano accompaniment at the Royal Flemish Music Conservatory in Antwerp, where thousands listened to his recitals from the tower of Antwerp Cathedral. Haazen was a driving force in the renaissance of the carillon art in Flanders following World War II.

From 1968 to 1981 he was Antwerp's official municipal carillonneur. He was instructor of aesthetics, music education, and Esperanto at the Van Celst Institute for Languages, Secretarial Studies, and Tourism and taught Esperanto at the Antwerp Continuing Education program for languages. From 1981 to 2010 he was municipal carillonneur in Mechelen and director Royal Carillon School "Jef Denyn" in Mechelen.

Performances
Haazen has performed many concerts all over the world. The Dutch musicologist and art critic Wouter Paap wrote in the New Rotterdam Courier: "A remarkably talented carillonneur. Haazen's playing has reached a high level of virtuosity. It is as balanced as it is transparent. It is distinguished in style, and at the same time a joyful, robust musicality emanates, belonging to the best traditions of Flemish tower music."

Works
Haazen wrote a five-volume method book for carillon and various publications about the carillon art and philosophical subjects. He promoted the carillon arts in Japan, Russia, Ukraine and China and in 2003 was appointed State Carillonneur at the Peter and Paul Cathedral in Saint Petersburg (Russia). In 2006 he became professor at the Faculty of Art (Department of Organ, Harpsichord, and Carillon) of the Saint Petersburg State University, as well as a guest professor at the Faculty for Comparative Study of Religions in Antwerp.

On 15 December 2012 he launched an international humanitarian project (UEA-UNESCO), to modify the Universal Declaration of Human Rights to include human obligations.

Awards 
 First Laureate of the International Carillon Competitions of the Holland Festival in 1966, 1967 and 1968.
 On 11 July 2015 he was awarded the Gaston Feremansprize by the Flemish Cultural Association "Marnixring" (Mechelen, Belgium).

References 

1944 births
Living people
20th-century Belgian male musicians
21st-century Belgian male musicians
Flemish musicians
Carillonneurs
Royal Carillon School "Jef Denyn" alumni